Omarumutu is a community in the Ōpōtiki District and Bay of Plenty Region of New Zealand's North Island, located near the mouth of the Waiaua River.

The area includes large tracts of Māori freehold land.

Demographics
The SA1 area is part of the Otara-Tirohanga statistical area.

The SA1 area had a population of 153 at the 2018 New Zealand census, a decrease of 30 people (−16.4%) since the 2013 census, and a decrease of 24 people (−13.6%) since the 2006 census. There were 66 households, comprising 72 males and 78 females, giving a sex ratio of 0.92 males per female. The median age was 47.1 years (compared with 37.4 years nationally), with 24 people (15.7%) aged under 15 years, 21 (13.7%) aged 15 to 29, 81 (52.9%) aged 30 to 64, and 30 (19.6%) aged 65 or older.

Ethnicities were 64.7% European/Pākehā, 45.1% Māori, 2.0% Asian, and 2.0% other ethnicities. People may identify with more than one ethnicity.

Although some people chose not to answer the census's question about religious affiliation, 51.0% had no religion, 37.3% were Christian, and 3.9% had Māori religious beliefs.

Of those at least 15 years old, 15 (11.6%) people had a bachelor's or higher degree, and 33 (25.6%) people had no formal qualifications. The median income was $25,700, compared with $31,800 nationally. 24 people (18.6%) earned over $70,000 compared to 17.2% nationally. The employment status of those at least 15 was that 66 (51.2%) people were employed full-time, 18 (14.0%) were part-time, and 6 (4.7%) were unemployed.

Otara-Tirohanga statistical area

Otara-Tirohanga had a population of 1,176 at the 2018 New Zealand census, an increase of 9 people (0.8%) since the 2013 census, and a decrease of 12 people (−1.0%) since the 2006 census. There were 408 households, comprising 591 males and 585 females, giving a sex ratio of 1.01 males per female. The median age was 46.2 years (compared with 37.4 years nationally), with 216 people (18.4%) aged under 15 years, 195 (16.6%) aged 15 to 29, 516 (43.9%) aged 30 to 64, and 249 (21.2%) aged 65 or older.

Ethnicities were 64.8% European/Pākehā, 50.8% Māori, 3.3% Pacific peoples, 2.0% Asian, and 1.5% other ethnicities. People may identify with more than one ethnicity.

The percentage of people born overseas was 9.2, compared with 27.1% nationally.

Although some people chose not to answer the census's question about religious affiliation, 47.7% had no religion, 34.7% were Christian, 9.4% had Māori religious beliefs, 0.8% were Buddhist and 1.3% had other religions.

Of those at least 15 years old, 114 (11.9%) people had a bachelor's or higher degree, and 279 (29.1%) people had no formal qualifications. The median income was $24,600, compared with $31,800 nationally. 108 people (11.2%) earned over $70,000 compared to 17.2% nationally. The employment status of those at least 15 was that 435 (45.3%) people were employed full-time, 153 (15.9%) were part-time, and 51 (5.3%) were unemployed.

Marae

The settlement is centred around Omarumutu Marae, opened in 1901. It features the Tūtāmure meeting house, built in honour of the ancestral chief of Ngāti Ruatākena, who overcame Ngāti Kahungunu on the Māhia Peninsula. Tūtāmure's original fortifications are still visible; the nearby Makeo peak was one of his strongholds.

Omarumutu War Memorial Hall, located on the marae, was opened by Minister of Māori Affairs Ralph Hanan on 18 March 1961. Bishop Wiremu Panapa and Reverend Rangi Ehu unveiled a memorial tablet inside, presented to Ngāti Ruatākena and Whakatōhea by members of the Māori Battalion, to commemorate both Māori and Pākehā who died during the Boer War, World War I and World War II.

Pine Taiapa oversaw the creation of the carvings, tukutuku and kōwhaiwhai which now decorate the hall. The artwork is promoted as some of the best Māori artwork in the country and is a tourist drawcard, open the public when tangi or other functions are not being held.

A memorial cenotaph on the marae, a white column on a concrete base and funeral urn, was initially unveiled with the names of eight local men who died during wars. The names of a further eight who died during World War II and the Vietnam War were added in 1978. A granite memorial stone, also on a concrete base, lists the name of a further four men who died during World War II.

In October 2020, the Government committed $61,944 from the Provincial Growth Fund to renovate the hall and town block, creating an estimated 8 jobs.

Education

References

Ōpōtiki District
Populated places in the Bay of Plenty Region